The 1924 Iowa State Cyclones football team represented Iowa State College of Agricultural and Mechanic Arts (later renamed Iowa State University) in the Missouri Valley Conference during the 1924 college football season. In their third season under head coach Sam Willaman, the Cyclones compiled a 4–3–1 record (3–2 against conference opponents), finished in fifth place in the conference, and outscored opponents by a combined total of 87 to 68. They played their home games at State Field in Ames, Iowa.

Harry Schmidt was the team captain. Schmidt and Norton Behm were selected as first-team all-conference players.

Schedule

Roster

Coaching staff

References

Iowa State
Iowa State Cyclones football seasons
Iowa State Cyclones football